Unterland, meaning "lower land", is one of the two electoral districts of Liechtenstein. The district's administrative seat is the town of Schellenberg, due to its historical existence as the Lordship of Schellenberg. It has 10 seats in the Landtag.

Geography
The district is less populous than Oberland (the other district) and takes up between a fifth and a sixth of Liechtenstein's total area. It comprises five municipalities and three villages, for a total of eight settlements.

See also
Oberland (electoral district)
Landtag of Liechtenstein
NUTS statistical regions of Liechtenstein
Lists of electoral districts by nation

References

External links

Electoral districts of Liechtenstein